Bhangar Mahavidyalaya is an undergraduate college in Bhangar, in South 24 Parganas district, West Bengal, India, established in 1997. It is affiliated with the University of Calcutta

Departments

Science
Chemistry (general)
Economics
Geography
Mathematics
Physics (general)

Arts and Commerce
Arabic
Bengali
English
History
Sanskrit
Education
Philosophy
Political science
Journalism and mass communication(general)
Physical education (general)
Commerce

Accreditation
Bhangar Mahavidyalaya is recognized by the University Grants Commission (UGC).

See also

References

External links

Educational institutions established in 1997
University of Calcutta affiliates
Universities and colleges in South 24 Parganas district
1997 establishments in West Bengal